Lorenz van Steenwinckel (1585–1619), Danish architect and sculptor, son of Hans van Steenwinckel the Elder
 Oluf van Steenwinckel (died 1659), building master, probably the son of Hans van Steenwinckel the Younger
Hans van Steenwinckel (disambiguation)

Surnames of Dutch origin